The following is a list of episodes for the Disney Channel Original Series, The Famous Jett Jackson.

Series overview

Episodes

Season 1 (1998–99)

Season 2 (1999–2000)

Season 3 (2000–01)

Film (2001)

External links 
 

Lists of American children's television series episodes
Lists of Canadian children's television series episodes
Lists of Disney Channel television series episodes